Luka Bojić (born 9 April 1992) is a Montenegrin footballer who plays as a midfielder.

Career

Club career
He started in his hometown club Budućnost Podgorica. In 2013, he spent some time on loan with Zeta. In 2016, he played for Jedinstvo Bijelo Polje. Later that year, he moved to Canadian Soccer League side Serbian White Eagles. With the club, he won the 2016 CSL Championship, scoring a goal in the championship final. He stayed with the club until the conclusion of the 2019 season.

International career
Bojić made fifteen appearances for the Montenegro national under-19 team from 2010 to 2011.

Honours
Serbian White Eagles
 CSL Championship: 2016

References

External links
 Luka Bojić at livesport.com 
 

1992 births
Living people
Footballers from Podgorica
Association football midfielders
Montenegrin footballers
Montenegrin expatriate footballers
FK Budućnost Podgorica players
FK Zeta players
FK Jedinstvo Bijelo Polje players
Serbian White Eagles FC players
Montenegro youth international footballers
Montenegrin First League players
Canadian Soccer League (1998–present) players